Stanislav Bartůšek (born 19 May 1961 in Ústí nad Labem, Czechoslovakia) is a Czech television journalist.   
    
He had worked as high school teacher before succeeding at the auditions for the sports section of the Czech Television. His main task is to present daily sports news programs, and he also works as a commentator for swimming and triathlon events. In addition, he has written scripts for several documentaries about cycling, swimming, triathlon, and other sports.

In 2000, his documentary named Za císaře... (For the Emperor...) presenting the life story of Czech cyclist Jan Veselý won the Juan Antonio Samaranch Award at the Santander Sports Movies Festival.

Bartůšek was also a prominent athlete who finished the Hawaii Ironman Triathlon in 2002 and swam across the English Channel in 2005, reaching the seashore after 10 hours and seven minutes, the second best national result that time. He participated in the Czech Cho Oyu and Mount Everest expedition.

Bartůšek is married and has two children.

References
Bartůšek's personal site on Czech Television website (in Czech)

1961 births
Czech journalists
Living people